The Naso or Teribe people (also Tjër Di) are an indigenous people of Panama and Costa Rica. They primarily live in northwest Panama in the Bocas del Toro Province and Naso Tjër Di Comarca. There are roughly 3,500 people who belong to the Naso tribe. It is one of the few Native American indigenous groups or tribes that continues to have a monarchy.

History
The Naso (Teribe or Térraba) people have traditionally occupied the mountainous jungle regions of western Bocas del Toro where they continue to identify with the lands along the river that became known in the Spanish speaking world as the Teribe or Tjër Di in Naso. ‘Di’ means ‘water’ and 'Tjër' is their mythical “Grand-Mother” who was endowed by God with the secrets of botanical medicine. Until as recently as three or four generations ago the Naso people led a remarkably autonomous existence. Dispersed among their clans and homesteads, and geographically isolated from most of the world, the Naso developed and nurtured their cultural self-sufficiency through the idiom and the institution of the family.

Overview
The Térraba, or Teribe, are an indigenous group in the Puntarenas region of southern Costa Rica with a rich cultural heritage. Located on approximately 34.7 square miles (9,000 hectares) along the Térraba River, the Térraba have survived off the land for more than 500 years. The river called Grande de Térraba is the largest river in Costa Rica, in the province of Puntarenas, also known as River “Diquís” that in their native dialect means “great water.” A significant part of the Térraba nation is living along the shores of the said river.

The Térraba are a warrior people that trace its roots back to the pre-Columbian Chiriquí civilization that dominated Costa Rica. The Térraba have a deeply spiritual relationship with the land and, especially, water. When the Spanish Conquistadors arrived in the early 1500s, they found Costa Rica to be a harsh country with few resources to exploit. In comparison to other pre-colonial civilizations, there were few indigenous to use for labor.

The Spanish brought Catholicism and smallpox, and many tribes were not able to survive both. Despite Spanish influence, the Térraba can trace their history back to specific events as early as the 1600s. The Térraba were able to maintain their culture, traditions and language in spite of the Spanish occupation and Catholic influence. They have recorded an extensive oral history to preserve it for future generations.

Language
The traditional language, Teribe, is only spoken by a handful of people in the community. However, the efforts to recover it are supported by the Teribe of Panama, another group that shares its culture and history with the Térraba of Costa Rica.
The Panamanian community has been able to entirely maintain the native language, and has assisted the smaller Costa Rican community by sending a professor to the area to help teach the language.

Historians cannot tell why and how those native tribes visited Cocos Island. However, Heyerdahl (1966) and Lines (1940) support the old statement of (Gonzalo Fernandez de) Oviedo regarding such early visits. (See more under Timeline.)

The work of Arroyo (1966) is probably the best linguistic work and dictionary of the Térraba language but more recent publications may exist. For a short bibliography on the Térraba language please refer to The Newberry Library’s Indian Linguistics in the Edward E. Ayer collection, Volume 2.

Timeline
1610

The Térraba participated with the indigenous groups Ateos, Viceitas and Cabecares in the rebellion that destroyed Santiago of Salamanca.

The Spaniards wrote of Cocos Island, “Allí se hallaron ciertos ídolos labrados de piedra”. Lines (1940) claimed the same. That is, “certain idols were found there [on Cocos Island], worked out of stone.” This indicates the visits of some native tribes before (or at the beginning of the) colonial era. The archaeological findings in Heyerdahl (1966) confirm that the Galapagos Islands, at about the same distance from the continent, had similar visits by South American Indians. It is possible that the temporary homeland or a base port of one of the tribes was on Galapagos Islands in those decades.

There is no detailed data about the Térraba before the year 1697. They numbered between 500 and 2000 persons then. Their men were described as being naked and distinct from other Costa Rican tribes by their fame as diligent workers. Their mortal enemies were the Changuenes that were mentioned in Spanish documents at least from 1680, as living on the Pacific coast of Costa Rica. In 1708-1709 the Térrabas also lived on the coast at Diquis, later called “Grande de Térraba.” They became very faithful Christians.

1710

Missionaries led by Fray Pablo de Rebullida and the Spanish military moved part of the Térraba population to the southwestern region of Costa Rica, near Boruca and the Térraba River. The town, San Francisco de Térraba, was founded in 1689. Its name was later shortened to Térraba.

1761

The northern Indians attacked San Francisco de Térraba, burning it, killing the men and capturing the women, a day after an attack on Cabagra, another local indigenous group. After the massacre, Térraba only had 300 people left.

1845-1848

After a church was burned, the Catholic priests decided that reducing the territory would conserve and protect the population. Within several years Pauline priests arrived to take over the Térraba community, but brought smallpox. The epidemic decimated the population.

1956-1977

Legislation to establish and protect the indigenous territories gave the Térraba the inalienable right to their traditional land, the use of their resources and some autonomy in self-governance.

1970s

Costa Rica began promoting clearing forests to convert them to agricultural and pastoral lands. Much of the Térraba’s forest was lost.

1982

The Térraba lost the right to own the minerals beneath the soil on their own land, under a new mining law.

1999

Costa Rica recognized indigenous languages in its constitution.

2002

Indigenous communities began protesting against the Diquís Hydroelectric Project, which was then known as the Boruca Hydroelectric Project.

2004

The title to the territory was amended and reduced without asking the Térraba, fragmenting the territory into blocks.

2007

Diquís project workers moved to the region and started work without consulting the Térraba community.

2009

On Oct. 6, more than 150 Térraba and others marched along the inter-American highway to demand respect for their right to participate in decisions involving their lands. They marched all the way to the town of Buenos Aires, more than 8 miles (13 kilometers) from Térraba territory. ICE employees filmed and shouted at them in Buenos Aires, causing a confrontation that required police intervention.

2011

The Costa Rican Electricity Institute (Instituto Costarricense de Electricidad – ICE) removed their equipment and suspended work in Térraba territory.

Economy
The Naso, who now live in the province of Bocas del Toro, Panama, are for the most part very poor subsistence farmers who supplement their earnings with the sale of the agricultural products (cocoa, oranges, plantains, etc.), animals (pigs, chickens, ducks, etc.), lumber (Cordia alliodora, Cedrela odorata, etc.) and some handicrafts which they transport to the relatively nearby city of Changuinola (population 30,000, two hours down river by raft or dugout canoe). While the Naso are isolated in geographic terms and receive few visitors to their communities, they are for the most part bilingual (Naso and Spanish), wear Western clothing, and many among them have converted to evangelical Protestant religions.
The Costa Rica branch has been successful in gaining United Nations financial support to build tourism facilities including hostel/cabin housing with plumbing and improvement to trails.

Lands
The enormous scientific, hydroelectric and eco-tourism potential of the Naso people’s ancestral territory has attracted considerable international and national interest. Beginning in the 1980s the Government of Panama transferred large sections of the region to its own system of protected areas (Palo Seco National Forest (BBPS) and La Amistad International Park (PILA). In the year 2005, three major conservation and development projects were proposing to significantly reorganize local land use activities. These included a new law to recognize Naso territorial rights and jurisdiction in the Panamanian National Assembly, a World Bank-funded Biological Corridor project (CBMAP) promoting sustainable development in indigenous communities and protected areas, and a hydroelectric project sponsored by a Colombian utility company (Empresas Públicas de Medellín).

In Costa Rica, Térraba lands are threatened by the Diquís Dam project, which would flood 10 percent of the land including important sacred sites and which would force the relocation of the approximately 600 indigenous Naso who live in the country.

Politics
The tribe is governed by a king. The succession, according to tradition, would follow from the king to his brother, to the older son of the previous king. Since the 1980s, succession is based on the vote of the adult population. Typically, when there is a sense within the community that there is dissatisfaction with the current king (or sometimes queen, for instance queen Rufina), another member of the royal family may choose to stand for a public vote to see if they can replace the current king. In 2004 King Tito was deposed following his approval of a hydro electric scheme on the Bonyic River which traverses Naso territory. He was deposed in a civil uprising in the capital - Siey Llik  - and forced into exile. His uncle is now considered the King of Naso by the majority of the tribe, although this state of affairs is yet to be recognized by the Panamanian Government.

List of Kings
 Bass Lee Santana
 Santiago Santana
 Santiago Santana (son)
 Chalee Santana
 Francisco Santana
 Lázaro Santana - (? - 1973)
 Simeón Santana - (1973–1979)
 Manuel Aguilar  - (1979 - April 25, 1982)
 Rufina Santana - (April 25, 1982 - July 30, 1988)
 César Santana - (July 30, 1988 - May 31, 1998)
 Tito Santana - (May 31, 1998- )
Valentín Santana - (May 30, 2004- )

Culture
The Térraba describe themselves as a matriarchal community. They pride themselves on their rich agriculture and their independence.

Most of the inhabitants in Panama speak the native language, although the majority also know Spanish. Very few of the Naso tribes adhere to Roman Catholicism. The Seventh-day Adventist Church, is very important. The traditional God is Sibö, who is a supreme God and creator. Most Naso live in elevated wooden houses, with thatched or zinc-coated roofing.

In Costa Rica, few native speakers remain, mostly elders. Intermarriage between the Costa Rica and Panama groups has brought some fluent speakers to live in the Costa Rica territories. As of 2012, the community in Costa Rica has brought in a teacher from Panama to reintroduce the language in the village schools.

See also
Bokota people
Indigenous peoples of Panama

Notes

Arroyo, Victor Manuel. “Lenguas Indígenas Costarricenses.” San José: Editorial Costa Rica, 1966.
Elon iMedia. Térraba. http://terraba.org. Accessed 1/22/2013
Heyerdahl, Thor. “Notes on the Pre-European Coconut Groves on Cocos Island in (Reports of the) Norwegian Archaeological Expedition to Easter Island and the East Pacific,” Vol. 2. London: George Allen and Unwin Ltd., 1966.
Instituto de Estudios de las Tradiciones Sagradas de Abia Yala, I. 2001. Narraciones Teribes: Nasoga Laiwãk. Vol. 7. Textos Sagrados. San José, C.R.: Fundación Coordinadora de Pastoral Aborigen.
Lines, J.A. “Reciente hallazgo arquelógico evidencia que la isla del Coco estuvo habitada en los tiempos prehistóricos.” San José: Diario de Costa Rica, May 12, 1940.
Meléndez, Carlos. “Costa Rica: Tierra y poblamiento en la colonia.” San José: Editorial Costa Rica, 1978.
Oviedo, Gonzalo Fernández de. “Historia General y Natural de las Indias,” Tomo V, in “Biblioteca de Autores Españoles.”  Madrid, 1959.
Paiement, Jason. 2009. The Tiger and the Turbine: Indigenous Rights and Resource Management in the Naso Territory of Panama. VDM Verlag. .

External links
 Naso Bibliography
 Naso photo gallery
 Maps of proposed Naso Comarca
 Crisis in Panama
 Site about culture of Térraba in Costa Rica
  web site entitled “Teribe Indigenous Cultural Association”
 Térraba River for the Térraba River

Indigenous peoples in Costa Rica
Indigenous peoples in Panama
Indigenous peoples of Central America
Circum-Caribbean tribes
Monarchies of North America